The Eastern State Penitentiary (ESP) is a former American prison in Philadelphia, Pennsylvania. It is located at 2027 Fairmount Avenue between Corinthian Avenue and North 22nd Street in the Fairmount section of the city, and was operational from 1829 until 1971. The penitentiary refined the revolutionary system of separate incarceration first pioneered at the Walnut Street Jail which emphasized principles of reform rather than punishment.

Notorious criminals such as Al Capone and bank robber Willie Sutton were held inside its innovative wagon wheel design. James Bruno (Big Joe) and several male relatives were incarcerated here between 1936 and 1948 for the alleged murders in the Kelayres massacre of 1934, before they were paroled. At its completion, the building was the largest and most expensive public structure ever erected in the United States, and quickly became a model for more than 300 prisons worldwide.

The prison is currently a U.S. National Historic Landmark, which is open to the public as a museum for tours seven days a week, twelve months a year, 10 am to 5 pm.

History

Designed by John Haviland and opened on October 25, 1829, Eastern State is considered to be the world's first true penitentiary. Eastern State's revolutionary system of incarceration, dubbed the "Pennsylvania system" or separate system,  encouraged separate confinement as a form of rehabilitation. The warden was legally required to visit every inmate every day, and the overseers were mandated to see each inmate three times a day.

The Pennsylvania system was opposed contemporaneously by the Auburn system (also known as the New York system), which held that prisoners should be forced to work together in silence, and could be subjected to physical punishment (Sing Sing prison was an example of the Auburn system). Although the Auburn system was favored in the United States, Eastern State's radial floor plan and system of solitary confinement was the model for over 300 prisons worldwide. Critic and activist John Neal in 1841 expressed revulsion at the international reputation of "a nation that broke away from all its bands and fetters, only fifty or sixty years ago — overthrowing prisons, palaces, and thrones in her march toward universal emancipation, already renowned throughout the whole earth, for her prisons, her manacles, and her badges of servitude."

Originally, inmates were housed in cells that could only be accessed by entering through a small exercise yard attached to the back of the prison; only a small portal, just large enough to pass meals, opened onto the cell blocks. This design proved impractical, and in the middle of construction, cells were constructed that allowed prisoners to enter and leave the cell blocks through metal doors that were covered by a heavy wooden door to filter out noise. The halls were designed to have the feel of a church.

Some believe that the doors were small so prisoners would have a harder time getting out, minimizing an attack on an officer. Others have explained the small doors forced the prisoners to bow while entering their cell. This design is related to penance and ties to the religious inspiration of the prison. The cells were made of concrete with a single glass skylight, representing the "Eye of God", suggesting to the prisoners that God was always watching them.

Outside the cell was an individual area for exercise, enclosed by high walls so prisoners could not communicate. Exercise time for each prisoner was synchronized so no two prisoners next to each other would be out at the same time. Prisoners were allowed to garden and even keep pets in their exercise yards. When a prisoner left his cell, an accompanying guard would wrap a hood over his head to prevent him from being recognized by other prisoners.

Cell accommodations were advanced for their time, including a faucet with running water over a flush toilet, as well as curved pipes along part of one wall which served as central heating during the winter months where hot water would be run through the pipes to keep the cells reasonably heated. Toilets were remotely flushed twice a week by the guards of the cellblock.

The original design of the building was for seven one-story cell blocks, but by the time cell block three was completed, the prison was already over capacity. All subsequent cell blocks had two floors. Toward the end, cell blocks 14 and 15 were hastily built due to overcrowding. They were built and designed by prisoners. Cell block 15 was for the worst behaved prisoners, and the guards were gated off from there entirely.

Inmates were punished with the "individual-treatment system."  At the time this form of punishment was thought to be most effective.  They would be separated from others.

In 1924, Pennsylvania Governor Gifford Pinchot allegedly sentenced Pep "The Cat-Murdering Dog" (an actual dog) to a life sentence at Eastern State. Pep allegedly murdered the governor's wife's cherished cat. Prison records reflect that Pep was assigned an inmate number (no. C2559), which is seen in his mug shot. However, the reason for Pep's incarceration remains a subject of some debate. A contemporary newspaper article reported that the governor donated his own dog to the prison to increase inmate morale.

On April 3, 1945, a major escape was carried out by twelve inmates (including the infamous Willie Sutton), who over the course of a year managed to dig an undiscovered  tunnel under the prison wall.  During renovations in the 1930s an additional 30 incomplete inmate-dug tunnels were discovered.

It was designated a National Historic Landmark in 1965.

The prison was closed in 1971. The City of Philadelphia purchased the property with the intention of redeveloping it. The site had several proposals, including a mall and a luxury apartment complex surrounded by the old prison walls.

During the abandoned era (from closing until the late 80s) a "forest" grew in the cell blocks and outside within the walls. The prison also became home to many stray cats.

In 1988, the Eastern State Penitentiary Task Force successfully petitioned Mayor Wilson Goode to halt redevelopment. In 1994, Eastern State opened to the public for history tours.

End of the solitary confinement system 

The solitary confinement system eventually collapsed due to overcrowding problems. By 1913, Eastern State officially abandoned the solitary system and operated as a congregate prison until it closed in 1970. Eastern State was briefly used to house city inmates in 1971 after a riot at Holmesburg Prison.

The prison was one of the largest public-works projects of the early republic, and was a tourist destination in the 19th century.  Notable visitors included Charles Dickens and Alexis de Tocqueville, and later notable inmates included Willie Sutton and Al Capone in 1929.  Visitors spoke with prisoners in their cells, proving that inmates were not isolated, though the prisoners themselves were not allowed to have visits with family or friends during their stay.

Most of the early prisoners were petty criminals incarcerated for various robbery and theft charges (muggers, pickpockets, purse-snatchers, burglars, etc.) and the first-time offenders often served two years.

The Penitentiary was intended not simply to punish, but to move the criminal toward spiritual reflection and change. While some have argued that the Pennsylvania system was Quaker-inspired, there is little evidence to support this; the organization that promoted Eastern State's creation, the Society for Alleviating the Miseries of Public Prisons (today's Pennsylvania Prison Society) was less than half Quaker, and was led for nearly fifty years by Philadelphia's Anglican bishop, William White. Proponents of the system believed strongly that the criminals, exposed, in silence, to thoughts of their behavior and the ugliness of their crimes, would become genuinely penitent.

In reality, the guards and councilors of the facility designed a variety of physical and psychological torture regimens for various infractions, including dousing prisoners in freezing water outside during winter months, chaining their tongues to their wrists in a fashion such that struggling against the chains could cause the tongue to tear, strapping prisoners into chairs with tight leather restraints for days on end, and putting the worst behaved prisoners into a pit called "The Hole", an underground cellblock dug under cellblock 14 where they would have no light, no human contact, and little food for as long as two weeks.

Prison reform and rehabilitation
SCI Graterford opened in the 1920s after disturbances occurred at Eastern State; the Pennsylvania prison board opened Graterford to assume functions previously held by Eastern State.

Prior to its closing in late 1969, Eastern State Penitentiary (then known as State Correctional Institution, Philadelphia) had established a far reaching program of group therapy with the goal of having all inmates involved. From 1967, when the plan was initiated, the program appears to have been moderately successful as many inmates were involved in the groups which were voluntary. An interesting aspect was that the groups were led by two therapists, one from the psych or social work staff, and the second from the prison officer staff.

Architectural significance

When the Eastern State Penitentiary, or Cherry Hill as it was known at the time, was erected in 1829 in Francisville (the idea of this new prison was created in a meeting held at Benjamin Franklin's house in 1787) it was the largest and most expensive public structure in the country. Its architectural significance first arose in 1821, when British architect John Haviland was chosen to design the building. Haviland found most of his inspiration for his plan for the penitentiary from prisons and asylums built beginning in the 1780s in England and Ireland. He gave the prison a neo-Gothic look to instill fear into those who thought of committing a crime.

These complexes consist of cell wings radiating in a semi or full circle array from a center tower whence the prison could be kept under constant surveillance. The design for the penitentiary which Haviland devised became known as the hub-and-spoke plan which consisted of an octagonal center connected by corridors to seven radiating single-story cell blocks, each containing two ranges of large single cells—8 × 12 feet × 10 feet high—with hot water heating, a water tap, toilet, and individual exercise yards the same width as the cell.

There were rectangular openings in the cell wall through which food and work materials could be passed to the prisoner, as well as peepholes for guards to observe prisoners without being seen. To minimize the opportunities for communication between inmates Haviland designed a basic flush toilet for each cell with individual pipes leading to a central sewer which he hoped would prevent the sending of messages between adjacent cells.

Despite his efforts, prisoners were still able to communicate with each other and the flushing system had to be redesigned several times. Haviland remarked that he chose the design to promote "watching, convenience, economy, and ventilation". Once construction of the prison was completed in 1836, it could house 450 prisoners.

Haviland completed the architecture of the Eastern state penitentiary in 1836. Each cell was lit only by a single lighting source from either skylights or windows, which was considered the "Window of God" or "Eye of God". The church viewed imprisonment, usually in isolation, as an instrument that would modify sinful or disruptive behavior. The time spent in prison would help inmates reflect on their crimes committed, giving them the mission for redemption.

Modern-day historic site

The Eastern State Penitentiary operates as a museum and historic site, open year-round. Guided tours as well as self-guided audio tours (narrated mainly by Steve Buscemi, with former guards, wardens and prisoners also contributing) are available. A scavenger hunt is available for children.

Visitors are allowed to walk into several specially marked solitary confinement cells, but most of them remain off limits and filled with original rubble and debris from years of neglect. The city skyline of Philadelphia is visible from the prison courtyard, which still has the original baseball backstop and a chain link fence atop the "outfield wall," the outer prison wall, to attempt to keep home run balls inside the grounds.

In addition, Eastern State holds many special events throughout the year. Each July, there is a Bastille Day celebration, complete with a comedic reinterpretation of the storming of the Bastille and the tossing of thousands of Tastykakes from the towers, accompanied by a cry of "let them eat Tastykake!" from an actor portraying Marie Antoinette. (This Philadelphia tradition sadly ended in 2018.)

The museum attracts close to 220,000 visitors each year.

Religious murals in the prison chaplain's office, painted in 1955 by inmate Lester Smith, remain visible to guests despite damage from exposure to sunlight.

The tour ends with an exhibit titled "Prisons Today: Questions in the Age of Mass Incarceration" which informs guests about the US prison system today and its failings.

Restoration
The facility was kept in "preserved ruin", meaning no significant renovation or restoration was attempted, until 1991, when The Pew Charitable Trusts provided funding so that stabilization and preservation efforts could begin.

Fundraising and projects
 Perimeter Lighting: In 2001, the Perimeter Lighting project, funded by the Department of Community and Economic Development ($250,000), and the 2000 Halloween Fundraiser ($50,000) were completed.
 Rotunda and Links Roofing: In 2002, the Rotunda and Links Roofing project, funded by Save America's Treasures Award ($500,000), the City of Philadelphia ($355,000), the Keystone Historic Preservation ($90,000), and the 2002 Halloween Fundraiser ($55,000) was completed.
 Industrial Building Stabilization: In 2003, the Industrial Building Stabilization project, funded by the Eastern State Penitentiary Board of Directors, Senator Vincent J. Fumo, 2001 Annual Appeal, Pennsylvania Historic and Museum Commission Grant, was completed.
 The Penitentiary Hospital: In 2003, the Penitentiary Hospital roof stabilization project began, funded by the 2002 Annual Appeal, with work completed in January 2004.
 The Penitentiary Greenhouse: In 2004, The Penitentiary Greenhouse stabilization project was begun, funded by the 2004 Annual Appeal, and work was completed in April 2005.
 Alfred W. Fleisher Memorial Synagogue: In 2006, the Synagogue project began. Named after prison reformer, founder, and President of the Board of Trustees of Eastern State Penitentiary from 1924–1928, the Jewish Synagogue restoration was complete in 2009. Funding was spearheaded by a Synagogue Restoration Committee, headed by Cindy Wanerman, and included the Suzanne F. and Ralph J. Roberts Foundation, the Aileen K. and Brian L. Roberts Foundation, the Douglas Alfred and Diane Bayles Roberts Foundation, Howard G. and Adele F. Fleisher, the William Portner Family, as well as a long list of other individuals.
 Eastern State Penitentiary's Solarium Sunshine and Fresh Air Above the Hospital Block: In 2008, the Solarium project began, funded largely by individual donations., Built in 1922, above the hospital to combat tuberculosis, restoration was important not only architecturally but for the future of cell block 3 below.
 Eastern State Penitentiary's Kitchen and Bakery: In 2009, the kitchen and bakery roof stabilization project was begun and completed, funded largely by individual donors. The project will allow protection for several years while funding for a permanent roof can be procured.
 Death Row, The Last Cell block Built: In 2011, collections began in preparation for restoration to the roof and drainage system of "cellblock 15". There was actually no one put to death at the penitentiary.
 Operating Room In 2003 and 2004, Donors to the 2002 Annual Appeal made temporary repairs possible to the roof and drainage system of the operating room and the Recovery Room, that prevented a possible collapse of the roof. It is a significant part of the penitentiary because prior to the 1910 completion, operations were typically carried out in cellblocks. Between 2009 and 2012, the roof was rebuilt over the Solarium and Cellblock 3. Donations were collected from 183 donors for the $35,000 needed for stabilization and conservation of the Operating Room. The $54,000 collected allowed for implementation of the "Hands-On History" program.

In 1996 and 2000, the World Monuments Fund included Eastern State Penitentiary on its World Monuments Watch, its biennial list of the "Most Endangered" cultural heritage sites.

Haunted house attraction
"Halloween Nights", formerly known as "Terror Behind the Walls", is an annual Haunted House Halloween event run by the Eastern State Penitentiary Historic Site, Inc. (ESPHS). The first Halloween fundraiser took place on Halloween weekend in 1991. The early events took various forms, including short theatrical performances and true tales of prison murder and violence. In 1997, the event was rebranded as "Terror Behind the Walls", becoming a high startle, low gore walkthrough haunted attraction.

In 2001, it was broken up into three separate, smaller haunted attractions, including a 3-D haunted house. At the time, it was the only 3-D haunted house in Southeastern Pennsylvania and one of the first in the United States. In 2003, four semi-permanent haunted attractions were constructed inside the penitentiary complex.

The 2014 event included six attractions: Lock Down, The Machine Shop, Detritus, Infirmary, The Experiment, and Night Watch. The 2016 event also included six attractions: Lock Down: The Uprising, The Machine Shop, Break Out, Detritus, Infirmary, and Quarantine 4-D. The haunted attraction Blood Yard was added in 2017.

Art exhibits
 Ghost Cats – When the prison closed in 1971, a colony of cats lived inside. When restoration began, the cats were captured and neutered, thus causing them eventually to die off. Artist Linda Brenner sculpted 39 cat sculptures, which surround the property. The sculptures were purposefully made of a material that slowly dissolves over time to represent the inevitable natural decay that faces all living things.
 The End of the Tunnel – Hundreds of feet of red piping were installed by artist Dayton Castleman representing paths of escape routes used by prisoners.
 Recollection Tableaux – Six dioramas were sculpted by artist Susan Hagen to represent important moments in the prison's history. They are scattered around cell block seven.
 GTMO – A replica of a Guantanamo Bay detention camp cell was set up by artist William Cromar inside one of the cells.
 Midway of Another Day – A metal sundial set up to show "the passing of time" by Michael Grothusen in the courtyard of cell block one.
 I always wanted to go to Paris, France – Artist Alexa Hoyer set up three TVs, one in a cell, one in a hallway, and one in a shower room, showing seven decades of prison films. The title I always wanted to go to Paris, France is from a quotation from one of the film excerpts screened in the prisoner's cell.
 Juxtaposition – Brothers Matthew and Jonathan Stemler divided cell #34 in cell block 11 horizontally. A grid at the ceiling supports a display of suspended plaster pieces along a single plane. Ground mica schist poured onto the floor softens the step and enhances the texture of the space, while a bench provides a vantage point in which to view and consider the overall effect of the piece.
 My Glass House – An ongoing project set up by artist Judith Taylor by taking black and white pictures of natural habitat found in the prison's walls. The prints are then turned into glass, and replace the missing glass in the greenhouse in the courtyard of cell block one.
 Living Space – Created by Johanna Inman and Anna Norton, Living Space consists of five videos containing time-lapse photographs of the ways Eastern State Penitentiary is altered by the changes of weather and light. The artists put their cameras in places that make Eastern State Penitentiary unique to capture the subtle ways nature plays upon the structure of the building. The goal was to create photographs which are contemplative. By allowing the public to see the gradual effects of time upon specific places, growth and decay are recognized and explored as components that make Eastern State Penitentiary a more living space.

 Purge Incomplete – Mary Jo Bole's exhibit explores the history of plumbing at the penitentiary. The building had running water before the White House did. Consisting of sculptural pieces made of resin, brass, and frosted glass, Bole's designs are modeled after John Haviland's original design for the plumbing at Eastern State Penitentiary. The exhibit includes views of the plumbing from the vantage point of those residing or working at the prison, including that of the prisoners, prison guards, and the manufacturers of the plumbing. Additionally, the exhibit showcases the sculptures as having both opaque and translucent factors, in which the translucent parts glow within the cells.

Cultural references

Due to its ominous appearance, gloomy atmosphere, and long history, Eastern State has been used as a location for television programs and films about hauntings. Paranormal TV shows like Ghost Hunters, Ghost Adventures, BuzzFeed Unsolved and MTV's Fear explored the paranormal at Eastern State. Eastern State was also used in an episode of Cold Case titled "The House" which dealt with a murder after an inmate escape. For the show, the prison was renamed Northern State Penitentiary.

On June 1, 2007, Most Haunted Live! conducted and broadcast a paranormal investigation live (for the first time in the United States) from Eastern State Penitentiary for seven continuous hours hoping to come in contact with supernatural beings. In the PlayStation 2 game The Suffering, players can find a video documentary of Eastern State Penitentary, one of the inspirations for the game.

At least two music videos have been filmed in Eastern State: On July 29, 1985 Tina Turner filmed her "One of the Living" video in the abandoned prison. Philadelphia punk band the Dead Milkmen's breakout hit "Punk Rock Girl" included footage of the band in the prison as well as driving through the surrounding Fairmount neighborhood.

Eastern State has also served as a location in several feature films. Terry Gilliam's 1995 film Twelve Monkeys used it as the setting for a mental hospital. The 1998 film Return to Paradise used it as a substitute for a prison in Malaysia.  The 2000 film Animal Factory, directed by Steve Buscemi relied heavily on Eastern State in its portrayal of a prison in a state of advancing decay. In June 2008, Paramount Pictures used parts of Eastern State Penitentiary for the filming of Transformers: Revenge of the Fallen.

In September 2008, the History Press released Eastern State Penitentiary: A History, the only comprehensive history book currently in print about Eastern State. It was written by Paul Kahan, a historian and former tour guide, with the assistance of the site's education director; the book has a foreword written by the penitentiary's former social worker.

In 2012, the soundtrack to the film Alpha Girls was recorded in Eastern State Penitentiary by the band Southwork.

See also
 List of National Historic Landmarks in Philadelphia
 National Register of Historic Places listings in North Philadelphia

References

Further reading

 Manion, Jen. Liberty's Prisoners: Carceral Culture in Early America 2015, University of Pennsylvania Press
 Boyd, Bruce "King of the Mountain: The Bruno Family Story" 2016 Ingram Press

External links
 
 

Historic American Buildings Survey in Philadelphia
1829 establishments in Pennsylvania
Defunct prisons in Pennsylvania
Government buildings on the National Register of Historic Places in Philadelphia
Prison museums in the United States
National Historic Landmarks in Pennsylvania
Museums in Philadelphia
History museums in Pennsylvania
Reportedly haunted locations in Philadelphia
Haunted attractions (simulated)
Government buildings completed in 1829
Philadelphia Register of Historic Places
Fairmount, Philadelphia
John Haviland buildings
1971 disestablishments in Pennsylvania